The Colonial League was the name of two mid-level American minor baseball leagues. The first Colonial League was a  Class C level league that existed from 1914 to 1915 as a minor league for the outlaw Federal League. The second Colonial League existed from 1947 through mid-July 1950. It was graded  Class B, two levels below the major leagues, and featured teams based in Connecticut, New York and New Jersey

History

1914 to 1915
The Colonial League began to operate as a Class C level league based in Southern New England in the 1914 season. In April, Alexander Bannwart drew notice by acquiring Big Jeff Pfeffer to manage the team in Pawtucket, Rhode Island. By May, it was suspected that Bannwart was working as an agent of the Federal League, an outlaw league working outside of the National Agreement. Bannwart denied this. Upon these news reports, some of the founding members of the Colonial League resigned, fearing banishment by the National Baseball Commission.

Though Charles Coppen was nominally the president of the Colonial League, Bannwart began to exert authority at the Colonial League offices. Later in the 1914 season, Bannwart drew anger when he attempted to make last minute changes to the schedule designed to increase competitiveness in the standings and maximize profits at the box office. Due to the backlash from the teams, the schedule was not changed. The league was reported to have lost $22,000 ($ in current dollar terms) in 1914. After the season, Bannwart unsuccessfully petitioned the National Commission to reclassify the Colonial League as Class B.

At the April 1915 league meeting, Coppen was re-elected as president and Bannwart was elected secretary. Walter S. Ward, the treasurer of the Brooklyn Tip Tops of the Federal League and son of George S. Ward, an owner of the Tip Tops, was elected as the league's treasurer. Wanting to expand into Springfield, Massachusetts, and Hartford and New Haven, Connecticut, territory that belonged to the Eastern Association, the Colonial League reorganized itself as a farm system for the Federal League and voluntarily withdrew itself from organized baseball. The Colonial League struggled financially in 1915, and Bannwart's policies were blamed. The quality of baseball was deemed to be below the expected standards of a Class C league in part due to the salary maximums set by Bannwart, diminishing fan interest in the league. In August 1915, Bannwart resigned from the Colonial League. The league collapsed during the 1915-16 offseason.

1947 to 1950
The Colonial was one of many minor leagues that briefly existed during the post-World War II baseball boom. It competed in the Northeastern United States with five major league clubs in New York and New England, established minor leagues such as the International League, Eastern League, Canadian–American League and Pennsylvania–Ontario–New York League (PONY League), and other fledgling circuits such as the postwar New England League and Border League.

As a whole, the Colonial was rarely adopted as a site for farm teams for major league clubs. Only two of its member teams (the 1948 Bridgeport Bees and Port Chester Clippers) ever affiliated with a big league parent club (the Washington Senators and St. Louis Browns, respectively).

Baseball Hall of Fame member Jimmie Foxx managed Bridgeport in 1949.

As the minors began to contract in the late 1940s, the Colonial League's days were numbered. It shut its doors on July 14, 1950, with only 80,000 fans reported to have attended games in the entire six-team circuit.

Cities represented

1914–1915
Brockton, MA: Brockton Shoemakers 1914; Brockton Pilgrims 1915 
Fall River, MA: Fall River Spindles 1914–1915 
Hartford, CT: Hartford Senators 1915 
New Bedford, MA: New Bedford Whalers 1914–1915 
New Haven, CT: New Haven MaxFeds 1915 
Pawtucket, RI: Pawtucket Tigers 1914; Pawtucket Rovers 1915 
Springfield, MA: Springfield Tips 1915 
Taunton, MA: Taunton Herrings 1914–1915 
Woonsocket, RI: Woonsocket Speeders 1914

1947–1950
Bridgeport, CT: Bridgeport Bees 1947–1950 
Bristol, CT: Bristol Owls 1949–1950 
Kingston, NY: Kingston Hubs 1948; Kingston Colonials 1949–1950 
New Brunswick, NJ: New Brunswick Hubs 1948 
New London, CT: New London Raiders 1947 
Port Chester, NY: Port Chester Clippers 1947–1948 
Poughkeepsie, NY: Poughkeepsie Giants 1947; Poughkeepsie Chiefs 1948–1950 
Stamford, CT: Stamford Bombers 1947; Stamford Pioneers 1948–1949 
Torrington, CT: Torrington Braves 1950 
Waterbury, CT: Waterbury Timers 1947–1950

Standings & statistics

1914 to 1915
1914 Colonial League
No Playoffs held

1915 Colonial League
Fall River & Taunton disbanded July 10. No playoffs held

1947 to 1950
1947 Colonial Leagueschedule
 Playoffs: Stamford 4 games, Waterbury 3. New London 4 games, Poughkeepsie 3. Finals: Stamford 4 games, New London 1.

1948 Colonial Leagueschedule
 New Brunswick moved to Kingston July 10. Playoffs: Port Chester 4 games, Waterbury 1.Poughkeepsie 4 games, Kingston 1. Finals: Port Chester 4 games, Poughkeepsie 1.

 

1949 Colonial Leagueschedule
Playoffs: Bristol 4 games, Waterbury 1.Bridgeport 4 games, Stamford 3. Finals: Bristol 2 games, Bridgeport 1.

1950 Colonial Leagueschedule
No Playoffs: The League Disbanded July 16.

References
 Johnson, Lloyd, and Wolff, Miles, eds., The Encyclopedia of Minor League Baseball, 3rd edition. Durham, North Carolina Baseball America, 2007.

Colonial League
Baseball leagues in New York (state)
Baseball leagues in New Jersey
Baseball leagues in Connecticut
Sports leagues established in 1914
Sports leagues disestablished in 1916
Sports leagues established in 1947
Sports leagues disestablished in 1950